Miodrag Kojadinović (born 1961) is a Canadian-Serbian linguist, interpreter, translator, writer, anthropologist, and theoretician of gender and sexuality.

Academic involvement
Born in Negotin, he completed his academic education in Canada, Serbia, and Hungary, worked in three embassies (transferring to the Canadian Embassy to Belgrade when James Bissett was ambassador there), in the media in Canada and the Netherlands, carried out research at Utrecht University, the University of Amsterdam (UvA), and, under the mentorship of Eduardo P. Archetti, at Oslo University. Since 2005 he has been teaching in the People’s Republic of China, where he also uses an unofficial Chinese version of his name: 妙谠 (simplified Mandarin; in pinyin: Miào Dǎng; lit. "Merciful Counsel" or "Generous Advice"), first at Guangxi University in Nanning, Guangxi Zhuang Autonomous Region, then at a colégio in Macau, and since 2012 at Sun Yat-sen University in Guangdong Province.

Writing
Miodrag Kojadinović is a polyglot and writes in English, Serbian, Dutch, and French and speaks two dozen other European and Asian languages.

He is best at short forms, focusing on short stories about localities, e.g. Macau, in a collection by global lusophone and China-based authors (published in three identical books in Chinese, Portuguese, and English) where he won the 1st prize in English, the Savamala old district of Belgrade (in Serbian), Shanghai (in English), or Pamplona (in Serbian), travelogues on Venice, Manila, Malacca, Vietnam, etc., and especially poetry (including short forms such as haiku, e.g. in Chiaroscuro for Ars Poetica). His collection of eight tales about China, Under Thunderous Skies, has Nanning, Shanghai, Macau, Hong Kong and Guangzhou as locations of the events. He has also published erotica, including Lambda Literary Award winning Érotiques Suprèmes—and academic writing.

His work has appeared in the US, Serbia (in Serbian and Hungarian), Canada, Russia, the Netherlands (in Dutch, West Frisian, and English), Slovenia, Spain, India, Mainland China,  Hong Kong, Macau, France,  Israel, Montenegro, Scotland, England, Austria, Germany, Australia, and Croatia.

He has also edited the first GLBT studies reader in Serbian (Čitanka istopolnih studija, 2001), the first major work on queer and gender non-standard issues in Belgrade (next collection of papers with the same topic was published only in 2009, referencing Čitanka).

Other media
His nomadic life between continents/countries is the topic of the documentary Double Exit (director Kim Meijer's graduation work for her MA course at the Utrecht School of the Arts), shown at the International Documentary Film Festival Amsterdam (IDFA) as a part of an omnibus by the students graduating in Media Production in 1996, as well as at events in Budapest and Belgrade.

His photography has also appeared in print and on the Internet.

Selected published works
Author
 
 
 
 Kojadinović, Miodrag (1997). Liefdespijn - Geen Medicijn: Chagrin d'amour durera toute la vie, Utrecht University 
 Kojadinović, Miodrag (1996). 'Harder! Harder! - Un Cri PriMâLE, University of Amsterdam
Contributor
 Footnote #1: A Literary Journal of History, USA, 2015 
 Tincture Journal, Issue Nine, Australia, Autumn 2015 
 
 
 
 
 
 
 
 
 
Translator
 
 
 ]

Footnotes

Sources
 Roberto Torres, Book Review: Assaracus, The Rainbow Hub, 2013 
 Vetar po ocu, Frankfurt am Main 2012, in Serbian
 First There Was a Letter/Prvo je stiglo jedno pismo, Labris 2005, in English
 РИСК Альманах: Западная лирика (RISK Almanach: Western Lyrics) by Дмитрий Кузьмин, 2002 in Russian
 Eurogames 2000, Zurich, Kulturagenda, in German
 Semi-annual Report, No. 1 by The Campaign Against Homophobia; January–June 1998, in Serbian
 "Na vodama vavilonskim" (By the Rivers of Babylon), Vreme weekly, Belgrade, 3 August 1992, in Serbian

External links
 on translation of Pessoa's Antinous to Serbian
 on contribution to defining LGBT terminology in Serbian
 30 Anni di movimento GLBT in Italia in Italian
 List of some of Miodrag Kojadinović's publication on the National Library of Australia site

Serbian writers
20th-century Canadian male writers
Canadian erotica writers
Lambda Literary Award winners
Canadian male poets
Queer theorists
Canadian people of Serbian descent
Serbian expatriates in China
Canadian expatriates in China
Living people
Linguists from Serbia
Linguists from Canada
Academic staff of Guangxi University
21st-century translators
Serbian male short story writers
Serbian short story writers
20th-century Canadian non-fiction writers
21st-century Canadian non-fiction writers
21st-century Canadian male writers
21st-century Canadian poets
1961 births
People from Negotin